Sarkanlu (also Romanized as Sarkānlū and Sārkānlū) is a village in Milanlu Rural District, in the Central District of Esfarayen County, North Khorasan Province, Iran. At the 2006 census, its population was 113, in 22 families.

References 

Populated places in Esfarayen County